The 1977 Balkans Cup was an edition of the Balkans Cup, a football competition for representative clubs from the Balkan states. It was contested by 6 teams and Panathinaikos won the trophy.

Group A

Group B

Finals

First leg

Second leg

Panathinaikos won 2–1 on aggregate.

References

External links 

 RSSSF Archive → Balkans Cup
 
 Mehmet Çelik. "Balkan Cup". Turkish Soccer

1971
1976–77 in European football
1977–78 in European football
1976–77 in Romanian football
1977–78 in Romanian football
1976–77 in Greek football
1977–78 in Greek football
1976–77 in Bulgarian football
1977–78 in Bulgarian football
1976–77 in Turkish football
1977–78 in Turkish football
1976–77 in Yugoslav football
1977–78 in Yugoslav football
1976–77 in Albanian football
1977–78 in Albanian football